Mayo Airport  is located  north of Mayo, Yukon, Canada, and is operated by the Yukon government.

Airlines and destinations

References

External links

Registered aerodromes in Yukon